Luka Juričić (born 25 November 1996) is a professional footballer who plays as a striker for Armenian Premier League club Pyunik. Born in Germany, he has represented Bosnia and Herzegovina at under-19 level.

Career
In 2015, when Juričić suffered several serious knee injuries that almost ended his career, he was out for almost two years but managed to recover and continue his career.

Pyunik
On 3 July 2022, Armenian Premier League club Pyunik announced the signing of Juričić. On 8 February 2023, Juričić extended his contract with Pyunik until the end of the 2023/24 season.

Honours
Široki Brijeg
Bosnian Cup: 2016–17

Šibenik
2. HNL: 2019–20

References

External links
 

1996 births
Living people
People from Neustadt (Aisch)-Bad Windsheim
Sportspeople from Middle Franconia
Croats of Bosnia and Herzegovina
German people of Croatian descent
German people of Bosnia and Herzegovina descent
Citizens of Bosnia and Herzegovina through descent
Association football forwards
Bosnia and Herzegovina footballers
Bosnia and Herzegovina youth international footballers
NK Široki Brijeg players
NK Neretva players
HNK Šibenik players
FK Željezničar Sarajevo players
Gimpo FC players
Premier League of Bosnia and Herzegovina players
First Football League (Croatia) players
K League 2 players
Bosnia and Herzegovina expatriate footballers
Expatriate footballers in Croatia
Bosnia and Herzegovina expatriate sportspeople in Croatia
Expatriate footballers in South Korea
Bosnia and Herzegovina expatriate sportspeople in South Korea